Alicia Crossley is an Australian recorder player. She was nominated for the 2020 ARIA Awards for Best Classical Album for her album Muse. Muse was recorded with the Acacia Quartet and contained songs composed by Lyle Chan, Anne Boyd, Chris Williams, Stephen Yates, Jessica Wells and Sally Whitwell

Discography

Albums

Awards and nominations

ARIA Music Awards
The ARIA Music Awards are presented annually from 1987 by the Australian Recording Industry Association (ARIA). 

! 
|-
| 2020
| Muse (with Acacia Quartet)
| Best Classical Album
| 
|

References

External links
Welcome | aliciacrossley

Living people
Australian musicians
Australian recorder players
Year of birth missing (living people)